Leptomyrmex niger is a species of ant in the genus Leptomyrmex. Described by Carlo Emery in 1900, the species is endemic to New Guinea.

References

Dolichoderinae
Hymenoptera of Asia
Insects of New Guinea
Insects described in 1900
Endemic fauna of New Guinea